Kentwood High School may refer to:

Kentwood High School (Louisiana), in Kentwood, Louisiana
Kentwood High School (Washington) in Covington, Washington

See also 
 Kenwood High School (disambiguation)